Glencoe is a census-designated place (CDP) in St. Mary Parish, Louisiana, United States. The population was 126 at the 2010 census. It is part of the Morgan City Micropolitan Statistical Area.

Geography
Glencoe is located at  (29.80576, -91.66789).

Louisiana Highway 83 passes throughout the entire community and heads 9 miles (14 km) east to the town of Baldwin. Louisiana Highway 318, which intersects with LA-83, heads 7 miles (11 km) northeast to intersect with Louisiana Highway 182 at the unincorporated community of Sorrel. 

Demographics

References

Population 112

Census-designated places in Louisiana
Census-designated places in St. Mary Parish, Louisiana